Neobisium incertum is a species of pseudoscorpions in the Neobisiidae family. The type locality is Sorgono in Italy, and the species is endemic to Sardinia.

References

Neobisiidae
Animals described in 1930
Arachnids of Europe